Tromsbuss AS was a bus company with operations in Tromsø, Karlsøy and Balsfjord, Norway, on contract with Troms county municipality. The company was a subsidiary of TIRB, that is controlled by Hurtigruten Group. In 2008, Tromsbuss was merged with TIRB and Ofotens Bilruter to form .

History
Bus transport in Tromsø started in 1946 by the municipal owned ferry company Tromsøya Buss- og Ferjeselskap. After the Tromsø Bridge opened in 1960 the company withdrew from ferry transport and changed its name to Tromsbuss.

References

External links
Official Website

Bus companies of Troms og Finnmark
Ferry companies of Troms og Finnmark
Companies based in Tromsø
Companies formerly owned by municipalities of Norway